This is the list of awards and nominations received by Senegalese-American singer, rapper and record producer, Akon.

Awards and nominations

American Music Awards

|-
|rowspan="3"|  ||rowspan="3"| Akon || Artist of the Year || 
|-
| Favorite Pop/Rock Male Artist || 
|-
| Favorite Soul/R&B Male Artist ||

Grammy Awards

|-
|  || "Smack That" (with Eminem) || rowspan="2"| Best Rap/Sung Collaboration || 
|-
|rowspan="4"|  || "I Wanna Love You" (with Snoop Dogg) || 
|-
|"The Sweet Escape" (with Gwen Stefani) || Best Pop Collaboration with Vocals || 
|-
| "Bartender" (with T-Pain) || Best R&B Vocal Performance by a Duo or Group || 
|-
| Konvicted || Best Contemporary R&B Album ||

Billboard Legacy

Made the Top Artists of the Year Chart in: 2009, 2011

Made the Billboard 200 Albums of the Year Chart in: 2004, 2005, 2006, 2007, 2008, 2009

Made the Billboard Hot 100 Songs of the Year Chart in: 2004, 2005, 2006, 2007, 2008, 2010

Billboard Music Awards

|-
|rowspan=1|2006
|Soul Survivor
|Hot Rap Track
|
|-
|rowspan=1|2007
|rowspan=1|Akon
|Artist of the Year awards
|
|-
|rowspan=2|2011
|rowspan=2|Akon
|Top Social Artist 
|
|-
|Top Digital Media Artist  
|
|-

Billboard Latin Music Awards

|-
|rowspan=1|2011
|rowspan=1|All Up 2 You
|Hot Latin Song of the Year
|
|-

World Music Awards

|-
|rowspan=1|2005
|rowspan=1|Akon
|World's Best Selling New Male Artist 
|
|-
|rowspan=3|2007
|rowspan=3|Akon
|World's Best Selling Internet Artist 
|
|-
|World's Best Selling African Artist 
|
|-
|World's Best Selling R&B Artist 
|
|-
|2008
|Akon
|World's Best Selling African Artist 
|
|-
|rowspan=3|2010
|rowspan=2|Akon
|World's Best R&B Artist 
|
|-
|World's Best Selling African Artist 
|
|-
|Sexy Chick
|World's Best Single
|

BET Hip Hop Awards

|-
|2008
|Akon
|Producer of the Year 
|
|-
|2008
|We Takin' Over
|Best Hip Hop Collaboration
|

BET Awards

|-
|rowspan=3|2007
|rowspan=1|Akon
|Best Male R&B Artist
|
|-
||I Wanna Love You
|Best Collaboration
|
|-
||I Wanna Love You
|Video of the Year
|

Filmfare Awards

|-
|2012
|Akon – Chammak Challo
|Best Male Playback Singer 
|

Teen Choice Awards

|-

|rowspan=4|2007
|rowspan=2|Akon
|Breakout Artist – Male 
|
|-
|R&B Artist 
|
|-
||Don't Matter

|Love Song
|
|-
||The Sweet Escape
|Single 
|

MTV Video Music Awards
The MTV Video Music Awards is an annual awards ceremony established in 1984 by MTV. Akon has the record for most nominations in the Most Earthshattering Collaboration category.

|-
|  || "Locked Up" || MTV2 Award || 
|-
|rowspan="3"|  || Akon || Male Artist of the Year || 
|-
| "Smack That" (with Eminem) || Most Earthshattering Collaboration || 
|-
| "The Sweet Escape" (with Gwen Stefani) || Most Earthshattering Collaboration || 
|-
|  || "Sexy Chick" || Best Dance Video ||

MTV Europe Music Awards

|-
||2005
||Akon
|Best Hip Hop Act 
|
|-
||2007
|Konvicted
|Album
|

MTV Video Music Award Japan

|-
|2007
|Smack That
|Best Collaboration Video
|

MTV Australia Video Music Awards

|-
|rowspan=3|2007
|Smack That
|Best Hip Hop Act 
|
|-
|Smack That
|Best Hip Hop Video 
|
|-
|Smack That
|Best Hook Up 
|

MOBO Awards

|-
|rowspan=2|2007
|rowspan=4|Akon
|Best R&B
|
|-
|Best International Act 
|
|-
||2008
|Best International Act 
|
|-
||2009
|Best International Act 
|

Juno Awards

|-
|2009
|Dangerous
|Single of the Year 
|

ASCAP Awards

|-
|rowspan=4|2007
|"Bartender"
|rowspan=5|Most Performed Songs
|
|-
|"Don't Matter"
|
|-
|"I Wanna Love You"
|
|- 
|"Smack That" (Shared with Eminem)
|
|- 
|rowspan=2|2008
|"The Sweet Escape"
|
|- 
|"The Sweet Escape"
|Song of the Year
|
|- 
|rowspan=2|2009
|"Dangerous"
|rowspan=6|Most Performed Songs
|
|- 
|"What You Got"
|
|- 
|rowspan=3|2010
|"Just Dance"
|
|- 
|"What You Got"
|
|- 
|"Right Now (Na Na Na)"
|
|- 
|rowspan=1|2011
|"Sexy Chick"
|

Urban Music Awards

|-
|2007
|Konvicted
|Best Album
|
|-
|rowspan=9|2009
|rowspan=2|Akon
|Artist of the Year 2009 (USA)
|
|-
|Artist of the Year 2009 (UK) 
|
|-
|rowspan=2|Freedom
|Best Album 2009 (USA)
|
|-
|Best Album 2009 (UK)
|
|-
|rowspan=2|Akon
|Best Music Video 2009 (USA)
|
|-
|Best Music Video 2009 (UK)
|

Ozone Awards

|-
|rowspan=3|2007
|We Takin' Over
|Best video
|
|-
|I Wanna Love You
|Best Rap/R&B Collaboration
|
|-
|Konvicted
|Best R&B Album
|
|-
|rowspan=3|2009
|rowspan=1|Akon
|Artist of the Year 2009 (USA & UK) 
|
|-
|Freedom
|Best Album 2009 (USA & UK)
|
|-
|Akon
|Best Music Video 2009 (USA & UK)
|

ECHO Award

|-
|rowspan=2|2006
|Lonely
|National/International Hit of the Year
|
|-
|Akon
|International Hip-Hop/R&B Artist 
|

MuchMusic Video Award

|-
|rowspan=4|2007
|Lonely
|Best International Artist
|
|-
|Akon
|People's Choice: Favorite International Artist 
|
|-
|rowspan=2|The Sweet Escape
|Best International Video
|
|-
|People's Choice: Favourite International Artist
|

Premios Lo Nuestro

|-
|rowspan="2"| 2010 || "All Up 2 You" <small>(with Aventura and Wisin & Yandel) || Urban Song of the Year || 
|-
| "All Up 2 You" (with Aventura and Wisin & Yandel) || Video Collaboration of the Year || 
|-

Vibe Awards

|-
|2005
|Soul Survivor
|Hottest Hook 
|
|-
|2007
|Locked Up
|Hottest Hook 
|
|-
|2008
|We Takin' Over
|Best Collabobation
|

Nickelodeon Kids' Choice Award

|-
|2007
|Sweet Escape
|MTV Hits Best Music Video
|
|-
|2008
|Don't Matter
|Favorite Song  
|

NRJ Music Awards

|-
|2006
|Lonely
|Best International Song
|
|-
|2006
|Akon
|New International Artist of The Year
|
|-
|2008
|Akon
|International Male Artist of the Year 
|
|-
|2009
|Akon
|International Male Artist of the Year 
|

Channel O Music Video Awards

|-
|2012
|Chop My Money
|Most Gifted Duo,Group or Featuring Video
|

mtvU Woodie Awards

|-
|2007
|Don't Matter
|Viral Woodie
|
|-
|2012
|Locked Up 
|International Woodie (Favorite International Artist Award)
|

BMI Pop Songs Music Awards

|-
|2008
|The Sweet Escape
|Pop Songs
|

O Music Awards

|-
|2011
|I Just Had Sex
|Funniest Music Short
|

Akon
Akon